Ronnie Karl Sundin (born October 3, 1970) is a Swedish former professional ice hockey defenceman. He was an alternate captain for Frölunda HC in the Swedish Elite League.

Playing career
Sundin started his career in his hometown team Ludvika HC. At age 18, he joined Mora IK of the Swedish 2nd division and played there for four seasons. In 1992, he joined Västra Frölunda HC of the Swedish Elite League.

Sundin was drafted 237th overall by the New York Rangers in the 1996 NHL Entry Draft, after a good year when he reached the Swedish Championships finals and made his debut on Team Sweden in the World Championships.

An NHL one gamer, Sundin played one game for the New York Rangers in 1997–98. He spent most of the season with the Hartford Wolf Pack in the AHL, where he helped the club reach the Calder Cup semifinals. In 1998, Sundin returned to Sweden and resumed his career with Frölunda. Sundin has won the Swedish Championships with Frölunda in 2003 and again in 2005.

Sundin has represented Sweden in the World Championships 7 times, and 1 time in the Olympic games. In 2006, he was a member of the Swedish gold medal winning teams at the Olympics and the World Championships.

Sundin became the player with most games played for Frölunda HC in the 2nd game of the Swedish Championships final on April 11, 2006, when he played his 685th game for the club. The previous record holder was Stefan Larsson.

He retired after the 2008–09 season.

International play

Played for Sweden in:
 1996 World Championships
 1997 World Championships (silver medal)
 2002 World Championships (bronze medal)
 2003 World Championships (silver medal)
 2004 World Championships (silver medal)
 2005 World Championships
 2006 Winter Olympics (gold medal)
 2006 World Championships (gold medal)

Career statistics

Regular season and playoffs

International

Records
Frölunda HC club record for most games played (891)

See also
List of players who played only one game in the NHL

External links

1970 births
Living people
Frölunda HC players
Hartford Wolf Pack players
Ice hockey players at the 2006 Winter Olympics
Medalists at the 2006 Winter Olympics
New York Rangers draft picks
New York Rangers players
Olympic gold medalists for Sweden
Olympic ice hockey players of Sweden
Olympic medalists in ice hockey
Swedish expatriate ice hockey players in the United States
Swedish ice hockey defencemen